The Eastern Zone was one of the three regional zones of the 1967 Davis Cup.

9 teams entered the Eastern Zone, competing across 2 sub-zones. The winner of each sub-zones would play against each other to determine who would compete in the Inter-Zonal Zone against the winners of the America Zone and Europe Zone.

Japan defeated the Philippines in the Zone A final, and India defeated Iran in the Zone B final. In the Inter-Zonal final India defeated Japan and progressed to the Inter-Zonal Zone.

Zone A

Draw

Quarterfinals

Philippines vs. South Korea

Semifinals

Philippines vs. South Vietnam

Indonesia vs. Japan

Final

Japan vs. Philippines

Zone B

Draw

Semifinals

Ceylon vs. India

Final

Iran vs. India

Eastern Inter-Zonal Final

India vs. Japan

References

External links
Davis Cup official website

Davis Cup Asia/Oceania Zone
Eastern Zone
Davis Cup